Bowed kites such as the Japanese rokkaku, and traditional versions of the more familiar "diamond" shaped kites such as the Malay or Eddy, are tensioned into a bow in order to improve their stability to the point where a tail often becomes unnecessary.

The classic long-tail diamond kite, with a simple two-point bridle, has its lateral roll or flutter (oscillation) greatly reduced or eliminated by a bow in its horizontal spar. Some modern designs use a fixed plastic joiner with a dihedral shape instead of a bowed spar to achieve the same stability effect.

See also
 Tetrahedral kite

References 
Bowed kites at the Virtual Kite Zoo.

External links
Kite Index Link Directory, For All Kite Related Websites.*

Kites